The 1999 Liverpool Victoria Champions Cup was a professional invitational snooker tournament which took place from August to September 1999 in Croydon, England. It featured players who had won tournaments the previous season.

Stephen Hendry won the event, beating Mark Williams 7–5 in the final, netting the £175,000 prize fund. Only the champion won any prize money, as part of a "winner takes all" format.

Group stage

Group A

  Ronnie O'Sullivan 4–0 John Higgins 
  Jimmy White 4–0 John Parrott 
  Ronnie O'Sullivan 4–1 Fergal O'Brien 
  John Higgins 4–2 Jimmy White 
  John Parrott 4–1 Ronnie O'Sullivan 
  John Higgins 4–3 Fergal O'Brien 
  John Higgins 4–3 John Parrott 
  Fergal O'Brien 4–3 Jimmy White 
  Fergal O'Brien 4–1 John Parrott 
  Ronnie O'Sullivan 4–2 Jimmy White

Group B

  Mark Williams 4–0 Stephen Lee 
  Stephen Hendry 4–1 Steve Davis 
  Steve Davis 4–2 Mark Williams 
  Ken Doherty 4–2 Stephen Hendry 
  Ken Doherty 4–2 Steve Davis 
  Stephen Hendry 4–2 Stephen Lee 
  Mark Williams 4–1 Ken Doherty 
  Steve Davis 4–3 Stephen Lee 
  Stephen Lee 4–1 Ken Doherty 
  Stephen Hendry 4–2 Mark Williams

Knockout stage

References

Snooker competitions in England
1999 in snooker
1999 in English sport